Charles Alfred Scofield (1853–1910) was a one term Democratic mayor of Norwalk, Connecticut from 1907 to 1908. He defeated Democrat Ferdinand B. Smith for the office in 1907. He had previously served on the Norwalk City Council.

References 

1853 births
1910 deaths
Connecticut Republicans
Connecticut city council members
Mayors of Norwalk, Connecticut